State of Texas vs. Melissa is a 2020 documentary by Sabrina Van Tassel. The documentary follows the case of Melissa Lucio, a Texan woman who was the first woman of Hispanic descent in Texas to be sentenced to death. It was selected for the Tribeca Film Festival in 2020, and won best documentary at the Raindance Film Festival. , Lucio has been on death row for 13 years, having been convicted of the abuse and murder of one of her children. The rights were acquired by Hulu, for streaming in the US.

Background
On February 17, 2007, paramedics were called to a residence, where an unresponsive two-year-old child was found. The child succumbed thereafter. The child’s mother, Melissa Lucio, was arrested and convicted of murder due to evidence of abuse. A 2011 appeal against the conviction was denied. However, due to trial court interference in the accused's right to present a defense, the sentence was unanimously overturned in 2019 by a three-judge panel of the Federal Appeals Court. However, this was again subsequently overturned and Lucio remains on death row.

In January 2022, Cameron County officials signed an execution warrant for Lucio. Her execution was scheduled for April 27, 2022. On April 25, 2022 the Texas Court of Appeals granted a stay in Lucio's case and remanded it back to trial court. The court found merit in four of Lucio's claims for clemency.

Summary

Reception
The documentary received overall positive feedback, with  score on Rotten Tomatoes.

See also
 List of death row inmates in the United States
 List of people scheduled to be executed in the United States
 List of women on death row in the United States

References

2020 films
2020 documentary films
American documentary films
Films about capital punishment
Documentary films about capital punishment in the United States
2020s American films